Patriarch Athanasius may refer to:

Athanasius I, Patriarch of Alexandria (r. 328–373 or 328–339, 346–373)
Athanasius I Gammolo, Syriac Orthodox Patriarch of Antioch (r. 595–631)
Athanasius I, Greek Orthodox Patriarch of Antioch (r. 1166–1180)
Athanasius I, Ecumenical Patriarch of Constantinople (r. 1289–1293, 1303–1310)
Athanasius II, Patriarch of Alexandria (r. 490–496)
Athanasius II Baldoyo Syriac Orthodox Patriarch of Antioch (r. 683–686)
Athanasius II, Ecumenical Patriarch of Constantinople (r. 1450–1453)
Athanasius II Dabbas, Greek Orthodox Patriarch of Antioch (r. 1611–1619)
Athanasius III, Syriac Orthodox Patriarch of Antioch (r. 724–740)
Athanasius III, Greek Orthodox Patriarch of Alexandria (r. 1276–1316) 
Athanasius III, Ecumenical Patriarch of Constantinople (r. 1634, 1635, 1652)
Athanasius III Dabbas, Greek Orthodox Patriarch of Antioch (r. 1647–1724) 
Athanasius IV Salhoyo, Syriac Orthodox Patriarch of Antioch (r. 986–1002)
Athanasius IV, Greek Orthodox Patriarch of Alexandria (r. 1417–1425)
Athanasius IV, Ecumenical Patriarch of Constantinople (r. 1679)
Athanasius IV Jawhar, Greek Catholic Patriarch of Antioch (r. 1788–1794)
Athanasius V Haya, Syriac Orthodox Patriarch of Antioch (r. 1058–1063)
Athanasius V, Ecumenical Patriarch of Constantinople (r. 1709-1711)
Athanasius V of Jerusalem, Greek Orthodox Patriarch of Jerusalem (1827–1844).
Athanasius V Matar, Greek Catholic Patriarch of Antioch (r. 1813)
Athanasius VI bar Khamoro, Syriac Orthodox Patriarch of Antioch (r. 1091–1129)
Athanasius VII bar Qatra, Syriac Orthodox Patriarch of Antioch (r. 1139–1166)
Athanasius VIII, Syriac Orthodox Patriarch of Antioch (r. 1200–1207)